WTMI may refer to:

 an acronym abbreviating the phrase "way too much information"
 WTMI (FM), a radio station (88.7 FM) licensed to serve Fleming, New York, United States
 WFEZ (FM), a radio station (93.1 FM) licensed to serve Miami, Florida, United States, which held the call sign WTMI until 2002
 WNWW, a radio station (1290 AM) licensed to serve West Hartford, Connecticut, United States, which held the call sign WTMI from 2002 until 2007